"Gone Crazy" is a song written and recorded by American country music artist Alan Jackson. It was released in January 1999 as the third single from his album High Mileage, and peaked at No. 4 on the U.S. country singles chart.

Critical reception
Deborah Evans Price, of Billboard magazine reviewed the song favorably, saying that Jackson's "stone-country vocal drips with pain and the remorse of a man who let love slip through calloused hands."

Jeffrey B. Remz of Country Standard Time cited the song as a standout track on High Mileage, calling it a "spare, sad ballad" and saying that the song's theme of lost love was "not surprising" given that Jackson had just separated from, and reunited with, his wife.

Chart performance
"Gone Crazy" debuted at No. 53 on the Billboard Hot Country Singles & Tracks (now Hot Country Songs) charts dated for the week ending February 6, 1999.

Year-end charts

References

1999 singles
1998 songs
Alan Jackson songs
Songs written by Alan Jackson
Song recordings produced by Keith Stegall
Arista Nashville singles